Dmitry Anatolyevich Chernyshov (also Tchernychev or Chernychev, ; born 29 September 1975) is a retired Russian swimmer. Between 1999 and 2001 he won six medals in relay events at the European and world championships. His team finished eighth in two freestyle relays at the 2000 Summer Olympics.

He graduated from the Siberian Academy of Physical Culture.

References

1975 births
Living people
Russian male swimmers
Olympic swimmers of Russia
Swimmers at the 2000 Summer Olympics
World Aquatics Championships medalists in swimming
European Aquatics Championships medalists in swimming
Universiade medalists in swimming
Universiade gold medalists for Russia
Russian male freestyle swimmers
20th-century Russian people
21st-century Russian people